Joe Dunn is a Republican member of the Illinois House of Representatives, representing the 96th district from 2003 until January 2009. In July 2007 Dunn had announced that he would not seek reelection in 2008, citing family and his career as the primary reason for his decision.

Dunn has a Master of Business Administration from DePaul University and a bachelor's degree from Northern Illinois University.

References

External links
Illinois General Assembly - Representative Joe Dunn (R) 96th District official IL House website
Bills Committees
Project Vote Smart - Representative Joe Dunn (IL) profile
Follow the Money - Joe Dunn
2006 2004 2002 campaign contributions

Republican Party members of the Illinois House of Representatives
1968 births
Living people
Politicians from Bayonne, New Jersey
DePaul University alumni
Northern Illinois University alumni
21st-century American politicians